Agia Anna ( meaning Saint Anne) is a mountain village in the municipal unit of Oleni, Elis, Greece. In 2011 its population was 168.  Agia Anna is built on the slopes of the hill Axofolia, a western spur of the Foloi plateau. In the village square, the elevation is 450 m, and the top of the hill is around 670 m. Agia Anna is 2 km northeast of Goumero, 4 km west of Klindia, 10 km southeast of Simopoulo and 10 km northeast of Karatoula. The area is forested, but suffered damage from the 2007 Greek forest fires.

Population

History

The village Agia Anna was founded in a remote place during Ottoman rule, to hide from the Turks. The village is named after its church. Between 1841 and 1912, the community was part of the old municipality of Lampeia. It was an independent community until 1997, when it became part of the municipality of Oleni under the Kapodistrias reform.

See also
List of settlements in Elis

References

External links
 Agia Anna GTP Travel Pages

Populated places in Elis